Outcast (sometimes listed as The Outcast) is a lost 1917 American drama film directed by Dell Henderson and starring Ann Murdock. It was based on the play Outcast by Hubert Henry Davies. It was produced by Empire All-Star Corp., a production unit of the late Charles Frohman who had produced the play starring Elsie Ferguson. Ferguson would reprise the role in a 1922 Paramount film.

Plot
As described in a film magazine, Valentine (Calvert), engaged to Geoffrey (Powell), breaks her engagement so that she can marry Lord Moreland (Carrington) so that she may have everything that she desires. Discouraged, Geoffrey associates with Miriam Gibson (Murdock), a woman of the streets known as the outcast. Miriam becomes devoted to Geoffrey and does all that is in her power to make him happy. Valentine is jealous because Geoffrey is so happy and believes that by coming into his life she will make it hard for him. Geoffrey, who still loves her, asks her to go away with him to South America, divorce Lord Moreland, and marry him. But Valentine refuses to give up London. So Geoffrey sends Valentine away and marries Miriam, and the two happily set out for their South American home.

Cast
Ann Murdock - Miriam Gibson
David Powell - Geoffrey Sherwood
Catherine Calvert - Valentine
Richard Hatteras - Hugh
Jules Raucourt - Tony
Herbert Ayling - Mr. Guest
Reginald Carrington - Lord Moreland
Kate Sergeantson - Mrs. Guest
H. Ashton Tonge - Taylor
V. L. Granville - Gerald
Maud Andrew - Bemish, Miriam's Maid
James C. Malaidy - Charles Gibson, Miriam's Father
Charles Hampden - Monsieur Duval
Zolya Talma - Nelly

Reception
Like many American films of the time, Outcast was subject to cuts by city and state film censorship boards. The Chicago Board of Censors issued an Adults Only permit and required cuts of three gambling scenes and the intertitle "I was driven to the streets, I had no choice."

See also
The World and the Woman (1916)
Outcast (1922)
Outcast (1928)
The Girl from 10th Avenue (1935)

References

External links

1917 films
American silent feature films
Lost American films
American films based on plays
Films directed by Dell Henderson
1917 drama films
Silent American drama films
American black-and-white films
1917 lost films
Lost drama films
1910s American films